Sugamata Choseichi is a gravity dam located in Tochigi prefecture in Japan. The dam is used for irrigation. The catchment area of the dam is 0.2 km2. The dam impounds about 6  ha of land when full and can store 490 thousand cubic meters of water. The construction of the dam was started on 1982 and completed in 2002.

References

Dams in Tochigi Prefecture
2002 establishments in Japan